Rødøy is a municipality in Nordland county, Norway. It is part of the Helgeland traditional region. The administrative centre of the municipality is the village of Vågaholmen. Other villages include Gjerøy, Jektvika, Kilboghamn, Melfjordbotn, Oldervika, Sørfjorden, and Tjong. The municipality consists of many islands to the west of Norway's second biggest glacier, Svartisen.

The  municipality is the 162nd largest by area out of the 356 municipalities in Norway. Rødøy is the 324th most populous municipality in Norway with a population of 1,153.

General information

The municipality of Rødøy was established on 1 January 1838 (see formannskapsdistrikt law). On 1 January 1884, the northern district of Rødøy was separated to form the new municipality of Meløy. This division left Rødøy with 1,945 residents. The borders of the municipality have not changed since that time.

Name
The municipality (originally the parish) is named after the island of Rødøya since the first Rødøy Church was built there.

Coat of arms
The coat of arms was granted on 12 February 1988. The official blazon is "Argent, a lion couchant gules". This means the arms have a field (background) that has a tincture of argent which means it is commonly colored white, but if it is made out of metal, then silver is used. The charge is red-colored lion that is laying down with its head up and its tail dangling down. The arms are somewhat canting because the municipal name means "Red Island", so the color red was chosen for the lion. The most striking formation on the island is a large, rocky mountain, which has a striking resemblance to a lion. The mountain's name is Rødøyløva, meaning "the Lion of Red Island", which is why this was chosen for the municipal arms. The silver background symbolizes the sea. The arms were designed by Olga Grimsmo Nilsen, former teacher in a local school.

Churches
The Church of Norway has two parishes within the municipality of Rødøy. It is part of the Nord-Helgeland prosti (deanery) in the Diocese of Sør-Hålogaland.

Geography
The eastern part of Rødøy is located on the mainland, just east of the Saltfjellet mountain range. The rest of the municipality consists of islands to the west including Gjerdøya, Storselsøya, Myken, Nesøya, Rangsundøya, Renga, and Rødøya. The westernmost part of the municipality is the Myken islands in the Vestfjorden, where the Myken Lighthouse is located.

The Tjongsfjorden is located in the northern part of the mainland of Rødøy, just north of the mountain Blokktinden. The Melfjorden is located in the southern part of the mainland, flowing out of the Saltfjellet–Svartisen National Park.

Climate
The Norwegian Meteorological Institute has a weather station near the Myken Lighthouse on an island west in the Norwegian Sea. Myken is situated 32 km from the mainland, and 25 km north of the Arctic Circle. This is one of the most oceanic stations in Northern Norway. The current station has recording since 1992, and an earlier station at same location was in operation 1920–1991. The all-time high temperature is  recorded July 1972; the all-time low is  recorded in February 1966. The driest month on record is September 2015 with 0.0 mm precipitation, and the wettest is October 1934 with 227 mm. The average date for first overnight freeze (below ) in autumn is November 10 (1981-2010 average) at Myken.

Government
All municipalities in Norway, including Rødøy, are responsible for primary education (through 10th grade), outpatient health services, senior citizen services, unemployment and other social services, zoning, economic development, and municipal roads. The municipality is governed by a municipal council of elected representatives, which in turn elect a mayor.  The municipality falls under the Rana District Court and the Hålogaland Court of Appeal.

Municipal council
The municipal council of Rødøy is made up of 17 representatives that are elected to four year terms. The party breakdown of the council is as follows:

Mayor
The mayors of Rødøy:

1838-1840: Carl T. Schmidt
1840-1842: Jakob Andersen
1842-1844: Hans Krey Hansen
1844-1848: Ole S. Jæger
1848-1850: Knud T. Hoff 
1850-1852: Petter Nielsen
1852-1856: Caspar Hansen
1856-1860: Sophus F. Søeberg
1860-1861: Anton Andersen
1861-1865: Børge Motzfeldt
1865-1867: Andreas Olsen 
1867-1871: Hans M. Jæger 
1871-1875: Børge Motzfeldt 
1875-1876: Jakob Gjertsen 
1877-1878: Anders Larsen Hoff 
1879-1880: Jakob Gjertsen 
1881-1888: Hans M. Jæger 
1889-1896: Simon Dahl 
1897-1898: Lars Larsen Hoff 
1899-1907: Rafael Røsok 
1908-1922: Jørgen A. Selsø  
1923-1925: Wilhelm Hoff 
1926-1934: Peter B. Andersen 
1935-1940: Toralf Heen 
1943-1944: Arnulf Hansen (NS)
1945-1947: Toralf Heen 
1948-1951: Sigurd M. Carson (Ap)
1952-1959: Olav Hoff (KrF)
1960-1967: Sven Hansen (Sp)
1968-1971: Hans Aakre (KrF)
1972-1975: Sven Hansen (Sp)
1976-1979: Hans Aakre (KrF)
1980-1981: Magne Hansen (H)
1982-1983: Sven Hansen (Sp)
1984-1985: Gustav Lorentzen (Ap)
1986-1989: Bernt Johan Arntsen (Ap)
1990-1991: Gustav Lorentzen (Ap)
1992-1995: Bernt Johan Arntsen (Ap)
1995-2003: Johan Anton Svartis (Sp)
2003-2019: Olav Terje Hoff (Sp)
2019–present: Inger Dagmar Monsen (Ap)

Notable people 
 Hans Olav Lahlum (born 1973) a Norwegian historian, crime author, chess player and politician; known for his unconventional style. He grew up in Rødøy, a small community that he says he did not find enjoyable.

References

External links
Municipal fact sheet from Statistics Norway 

 
Municipalities of Nordland
Populated places of Arctic Norway
1838 establishments in Norway